George Osborn may refer to:
 George Osborn (minister)
 George Osborn (cricketer)
 George Osborn (mathematician)
 Sir George Osborn, 4th Baronet, British general and MP

See also
 George Osborne (disambiguation)